A sweetheart pillowcase is a souvenir designed to be sent home by servicemen during World War I and World War II. It often featured the name of the base or location where the soldier was stationed and a short poem.

See also 
 Short snorter

References

Further reading

External links 
 Paratrooper Sweetheart Pillow Covers – Paratrooper.be

Militaria
Pillows
United States military traditions